Shimotsuke may refer to:

 Shimotsuke Province
 Shimotsuke, Tochigi